Francisco de Merlo (1693-1758) was a Spanish notary and politician, who served during the Viceroyalty of Peru as Notary Mayor of the Government of Buenos Aires. He was the founder of the city of Merlo (Buenos Aires Province),  and also took part in the foundation of Montevideo in the Banda Oriental.

Biography 

Merlo was born in Sevilla, son Antonio de Merlo and Juana Gerónima Barbosa, a distinguished Spanish family. He was married twice, first in Spain to María Teresa de Gámiz, daughter of Pedro Gamiz de las Cuevas and Tomasa Álvarez de Lasarte, natives of Madrid. And second on November 30, 1713 in Buenos Aires, with Francisca del Toro, daughter of Damián del Toro and Lucía González de Marquina, belonging to an illustrious family.

On September 19, 1716, Francisco de Merlo was appointed as Escribano Mayor de Gobierno of the Río de la Plata. In 1717, he notified the City Council of Buenos Aires about the death of King Louis XIV of France, who had died two years ago in Versailles. Exercising the position of notary of government he participated in the founding act of the city of Montevideo. And on August 28, 1755 he founded the town of Merlo in Buenos Aires Province. 

Francisco de Merlo and his wife Francisca del Toro, were godparents of Antonio Espinosa Barrionuevo, descendant of Baltasar de Barrionuevo, a Spanish conquistador, born in Talavera de la Reina.

References

External links 
familysearch.org
familysearch.org
www.merlo.gob.ar

1693 births
1758 deaths
Spanish colonial governors and administrators
People from Seville
People from Buenos Aires
People from Buenos Aires Province
Spanish notaries